Rocco Sisto (born February 18, 1953) is an Italian-American stage, film, television and voice actor.

Early life
Sisto was born on February 18, 1953, in Bari, Italy, and moved to Addison, Illinois, at an unknown age. He attended and graduated Addison Trail High School in 1970 and studied acting at New York University's Graduate Acting Program at the Tisch School of the Arts, graduating in 1977.

Acting career
On TV, he played the young Junior Soprano in the HBO series The Sopranos. He has appeared as well in Star Trek: The Next Generation, Law & Order, CSI: Crime Scene Investigation, Blue Bloods, and Madam Secretary.

In film he has been seen in After Hours, Far and Away, Carlito's Way, Donnie Brasco, Illuminata, and The American Astronaut. His voice work includes Grand Theft Auto: San Andreas and The Warriors.

Sisto has acted in the New York Shakespeare Festival at the Delacorte Theater. In 1996 he received a Drama Desk Award nomination for his acting in the play Quills.

Filmography

Film

Television

Video Games

References

External links
 
 
 Rocco Sisto at the Internet Off-Broadway Database

1953 births
Living people
American people of Italian descent
Italian male film actors
Italian male stage actors
Italian male television actors
Italian male voice actors
People from Bari
Tisch School of the Arts alumni
People from Addison, Illinois
Italian emigrants to the United States